Mohammad Jasser (Arabic:محمد جاسر) (born 21 March 1992) is a Qatari footballer who plays as a goalkeeper .

Career

Al-Sadd
Mitwali started his career at Al-Sadd and is a product of the Al-Sadd's youth system.

Al-Rayyan
On Season 2012, left Al-Sadd and signed with Al-Rayyan, On 28 January 2014, Jasser made his professional debut for Al-Rayyan against Al-Sailiya in the Pro League, replaying Saud Al Hajiri . landed with Al-Rayyan from the Qatar Stars League to the Qatari Second Division in 2013-14 season. ended up with Al-Rayyan from the Qatari Second Division to the Qatar Stars League in the 2014-15 season.

Al-Khor
On 2 October 2017, he left Al-Rayyan and signed with Al-Khor . On 14 October 2018, Jasser made his professional debut for Al-Khor against Al-Gharafa in the Pro League, replaying Amine Lecomte.

Al-Shahania
In early 2018, he left Al-Khor and signed with Al-Shahania.

External links

References

Living people
1992 births
Qatari footballers
Al Sadd SC players
Al-Rayyan SC players
Al-Khor SC players
Al-Shahania SC players
Qatar Stars League players
Qatari Second Division players
Association football goalkeepers
Place of birth missing (living people)